Côtes Catalanes is an IGP wine region in Languedoc-Roussillon. Syrah, Carignan and Grenache are common grapes in the 
appellation. The region produces dry red, rose and white wines.

References

Wine regions of France
Languedoc-Roussillon